Qaleh-ye Juy (also Romanized as Qal‘eh-ye Jūy) is a village in Balesh Rural District, in the Central District of Darab County, Fars Province, Iran. At the 2006 census, its population was 32, in 6 families.

References 

Populated places in Darab County